Oenopota cinerea is a species of sea snail, a marine gastropod mollusk in the family Mangeliidae.

Description
The length of the shell varies between 11 mm and 22 mm.

The shell is yellowish brown. The space above the tuberculated angle is smooth.

Distribution
This species occurs in European waters, the Northwest Atlantic Ocean and the arctic waters of Canada.

References

 Møller H. O., 1842 :Index Molluscorum Groenlandiae ; Naturhistorisk Tidsskrift, Kjøbenhavn 4 (1): 76–97
 Gofas, S.; Le Renard, J.; Bouchet, P. (2001). Mollusca, in: Costello, M.J. et al. (Ed.) (2001). European register of marine species: a check-list of the marine species in Europe and a bibliography of guides to their identification. Collection Patrimoines Naturels, 50: pp. 180–213

External links
 
 

cinerea
Gastropods described in 1842